The Chinese music industry has a growing trends of idols and idol groups, entertainer manufactured and marketed for image, attractiveness. Idols are primarily singers (either as a member of a group or as a solo act), but they are also trained in other roles, such as acting, dancing, and modeling. Unlike other celebrities, idols are promoted through merchandise and endorsements by talent agencies while maintaining a carefully curated public image and social media presence, as well a strong emotional connection with a passionate fan base through concerts and meetups.

History 
The 2010s saw the rise in popularity of Japanese-style idol groups such as SNH48 and boy idols like TFBoys and K-pop style idol groups such as Nine Percent, R1SE, INTO1, and many more. Korean idol groups such as Exo-M, SJ-M and T-ara also reached a larger audience through performances in China.

In the following years, a large number of idol groups debuted, beginning what media nicknamed the Age of the Idol. On January 27, some members of SNH48 performed on the CCTV New Year's Gala 2017 as backup dancers during a segment with Coco Lee and JJ Lin. This was the first appearance by an idol group at a major Chinese event.

Idol survival shows 
Following the success of the Super Girl TV series in China, there has been a lack of girl groups in the Chinese speaking world. So there was an open market in China for Survival shows. In 2018, there were a number of idol survival shows, like Idol Producer and Produce 101 China, through which Nine Percent and Rocket Girls 101 debuted. Youth With You season 1 and Produce Camp 2019 appeared in 2019.

There are two main brands that have sizable presence in the Chinese entertainment. They are Idol Producer by IQIYI and Produce 101 China by Tencent.

References 

Chinese idols
Teen idols
Chinese popular culture
Chinese youth culture